Hog Back is a ghost town in Pleasant Hill Township, Ellis County, Kansas, United States.

History

References

Further reading

External links
 Ellis County maps: Current, Historic, KDOT

Former populated places in Ellis County, Kansas
Former populated places in Kansas